The 3 arrondissements of the Val-d'Oise department are:
 Arrondissement of Argenteuil, (subprefecture: Argenteuil) with 17 communes.  The population of the arrondissement was 412,334 in 2016.  
 Arrondissement of Pontoise, (prefecture of the Val-d'Oise department: Pontoise) with 105 communes.  The population of the arrondissement was 338,425 in 2016.
 Arrondissement of Sarcelles, (subprefecture: Sarcelles) with 62 communes.  The population of the arrondissement was 471,164 in 2016.

History

As parts of the department Seine-et-Oise, the arrondissement of Pontoise was established in 1800, the arrondissement of Montmorency in 1962 and the arrondissement of Argenteuil in 1966. In 1968 the department Val-d'Oise was created from part of the former department Seine-et-Oise, and the arrondissements of Pontoise, Argenteuil and Montmorency became part of it. In March 2000 Sarcelles replaced Montmorency as subprefecture.

The borders of the arrondissements of Val-d'Oise were modified in January 2017:
 10 communes from the arrondissement of Pontoise to the arrondissement of Argenteuil
 two communes from the arrondissement of Pontoise to the arrondissement of Sarcelles
 one commune from the arrondissement of Sarcelles to the arrondissement of Pontoise

References

Val-d'Oise